Condor (also Candorus, Cadoc and other variants) was a legendary Cornish nobleman. The first known mentions of Condor are from heralds and antiquarians in the late sixteenth century, who recorded claims that he had been earl of Cornwall at the time of the Norman Conquest in 1066, and paid homage to William the Conqueror to keep his position. William Hals speculated that he may have supported the rebels at the Siege of Exeter (1068) and lost his earldom; much of Cornwall was given to William's Norman supporters soon afterwards. Condor's son Cadoc may have regained the title under Henry I, and later passed it through his daughter to Reginald de Dunstanville.

History

According to William Hals, writing in the eighteenth century, Condor may have been born in St Clement, or perhaps lived there. Hals also associates the Intsworth peninsula in St Anthony parish, the Condura and Tregarne manors in St Keverne parish, and Trematon manor with Condor. Early nineteenth century Cornish historian Richard Polwhele calls Launceston, Tintagel, and Trematon castles the residences of Condor and the ancient earls of Cornwall. Sixteenth century herald Robert Glover described Condor as being "", while William Borlase, writing in the eighteenth century, said that Condor was "descended from a long train of Ancestors, sometime called Kings, sometime Dukes, and Earls of Cornwall". A sixteenth century armory even refers to Condor as "Erle of Devon". Some modern sources connect Condor with the last recorded king of Cornwall, Donyarth (died 875), and assert that Condor was his direct descendant.

Glover, and antiquaries Richard Carew and John Williams write that Condor was briefly appointed as the first Count (according to Glover) or Earl of Cornwall by William the Conqueror after the Norman Conquest of England, after paying homage to William for his earldom. Hals suggests that Condor may have supported the rebels at the Siege of Exeter in 1068 and lost his earldom as a result; William did travel to Cornwall following the siege in a show of strength. Brian of Brittany fought for the Normans at the siege, and was rewarded with lands in Devon and Cornwall; The Complete Peerage states that he received Cornwall and west Devon when they were taken by the Normans. Brian was probably deposed after the revolt of the Earls in 1075, and his lands in Cornwall given to William's half-brother Robert, Count of Mortain who owned virtually all of Cornwall by the time of Domesday in 1086.

When Robert's son William, Count of Mortain rebelled against King Henry I in 1104 his lands were stripped, and, according to McKenzie, Woolwater, and Polwhele, they may have been restored to Condor's son, Cadoc. Hooker, Carew, Williams, and Hals all write that Cadoc had one daughter and heir, called Hawisia, Avicia, Alicia, Amicia, Agnes, or Beatrix, who married Reginald de Dunstanville. Williams and Hals say that through her, Reginald claimed the title Earl of Cornwall, which he was later formally invested with by his half-sister Empress Matilda, after it was taken by Alan of Richmond during the Anarchy.

Name 
Condor's name is not certain, with Carew giving both his and his son's names as Condor, but noting that Camden referred to him as Cadoc. Camden's first editions of Britannia give his name as Cadocus, but from 1607 he revised that to "Candorus, called by others Cadocus". Williams gives both his and his son's names as Candor. Hals gives his name as Cundor or Condor, and Condorus/Condurus/Condura in Latin, and his son as Cad-dock/Caddock/Cradock or Condor the Second. Frederick Lyde Caunter gives Contor as a variant spelling.

Hals wrote that the name Condor was in all probability taken from a place in St Clement called Conor or Condura, which Davies Gilbert says means 'the King or Prince's Water'. Richard Charnock found this less likely than Pryce's suggestion that Condurra or Condourra comes from  'the neck of water'. John Bannister gives Condora as possibly being from 'the head' 'between the two waters', and Condurra/Condurrow as 'druid's down', 'the neck of water', or possibly 'oak' 'down'.

William Pryce suggests the meaning of the name Cadoc derives from  'war',  'a soldier' or 'a champion', and  'a man of war'. Hals translates it as meaning to 'bear or carry-war'. Craig Weatherhill gives the meaning of Cadoc as 'man of battle'. Bannister says that the name Cadoc means 'warlike' (like the Welsh ), while Cradock means 'beloved' (like the Welsh ).

Early sources

The Names of the Gentlemen of Devonshire and Cornwall, with their Arms, a sixteenth century armory, lists:

Robert Glover's manuscript "De Ducibus Cornubiæ" mentions:

In Britannia (1586–1610), William Camden wrote:

John Hooker's manuscript "The Stem of the Earls and Dukes of Cornwall" states:

In his Survey of Cornwall (1602), the antiquary Richard Carew wrote:

In the Book of Baglan (1600–1607), John Williams wrote:

In his History of Cornwall, William Hals wrote:

William Borlase wrote in The Antiquities of Cornwall (1754):

Claimed descent from Condor
The Liskeard lawyer Frederick Lyde Caunter reports that John the Chanter, Bishop of Exeter from 1184–1190, was said to be a great-grandson of Condor.

Caunter also states that "There has always been a legend in the family that the Devonshire Caunters are descended from Condor, sometimes written 'Contor', Earl of Cornwall". Caunter goes on to cite Charles Broughton, the author of a nineteenth century manuscript, Origin of the family of Caunter in Devonshire & Canter in Cornwall. Broughton, an Under-Secretary at the Foreign Office and apparently a friend of Richard MacDonald Caunter, wrote that "the Caunter family part of whom settled in Devonshire & part in Cornwall, are descended from Condor" and that Condor's descendants "in the direct line settled in that part of the County called 'the South Hams', & a younger branch retired to a more remote part of the County of Cornwall." Caunter adds, however, that he was unable to find confirmation for Broughton's statements.

See also

 Cornish heraldry
 Higher Condurrow

Notes

References

Monarchs of Cornwall
Earls of Cornwall
Medieval Cornish people
11th-century rulers in Europe
Medieval Cornwall